The Titan IIIM was a planned American expendable launch system, intended to launch the Manned Orbiting Laboratory and other payloads. Development was cancelled in 1969. The stretched core stage was used on some versions of the Titan IIIB and the projected UA1207 solid booster rockets were eventually used on the Titan IV.

Development
1969 April 27 - First static test firing of Titan IIIM seven segment solid rocket booster motor. Firing took place at the United Technologies Coyote Canyon test site at the southern edge of San Jose, California, and generated  for two minutes.

Planned flights
1970 - Uncrewed Gemini-B/Titan IIIM qualification flight
1971 - Uncrewed Gemini-B/Titan IIIM qualification flight

References

External links

Titan (rocket family)
Abandoned military rocket and missile projects of the United States
Military space program of the United States